Nikolay Andrushchenko, (September 10, 1943  – April 19, 2017), a Russian journalist for the Novy Peterburg newspaper in St. Petersburg, Russia, died at the Mariinsky Hospital after being beaten. He was a well-known critic and part of the opposition to Vladimir Putin in Russia. Andruschenko was part of a critical documentary about Putin called 'Who is Mr. Putin' that linked President Putin with the organized crime, which is banned in Russia.

Personal 
Nikolay Andruschenko was born in 1943 in the city of Leninogorsk in Kazakhstan. He earned a doctorate in mathematics and physics at the Saint Petersburg State University. In the early 1990s, he started his political career in the St. Petersburg City Council, which lasted for 3 years. He lived in St. Petersburg for a long time. He leaves a wife and two children, a son and a daughter.

Career 
Nikolay Andruschenko started his political career in the early 1990s. He became a member of the St. Petersburg City Council. Because of what he experienced during the end of the Soviet Union he wanted to change Russia, especially by investigating the corruption in his country. He is the co-founder of the newspaper Novy Peterburg for which he wrote until his death in 2017. In 2007 Novy Petersburg was shut down after two official warnings because of two articles that were published. One article from Andruschenko and another one by Konstantin Chernyaev. Novy Peterburg went to court and in 2009 they won their case and could publish again.  He was attacked twice in the months before he died, because of some documents that could have been related to investigations he was working on. He was famous for his articles about human rights and his critic against the Russian president Vladimir Putin. He gave several interviews about his contacts with Putin in the 1990s when Andruschenko was working as a lawmaker and Putin was working for the Mayor Anatoly Sobchak. Andruschenko said that the center of Putin's politics had always been money and nothing else.

Controversies
In 2007 he was charged with libel, extremism and insult by Yunis Lukmanov, the chairman of the housing committee of the city. He was found guilty by a Russian court and had to pay a fine. After that Andruschenko decided to renounce his Russian citizenship. Two years later in 2009 he was charged with insult of Dmitry Mazurov, a member of the Russian prosecutor. He was found guilty and had to pay 20.000 Russian rubel but the prosecutors dropped the cases of libel and extremism. The original charges were based on articles about oppositions protest and about a trial of four men that had been convicted of murdering a student.

Death 
Nikolay Andruschenko was on his way to a business meeting March 9, 2017 when a group of unknown people beat him until he lost consciousness. Several hours later he was found near his house with head trauma. He was rushed to the Mariinsky Hospital where doctors tried to save his life with brain surgery, but left him in a medically-induced coma. Although he started breathing on his own again, he died on April 19, 2017. Denis Usov, editor of the Novy Peterburg believed that the attack was linked to Andruschenko's articles about corruption in St. Petersburg.

The attack was investigated by the 78th police department in the Central District of St. Petersburg, but according to Alevtina Ageyeva, director of Novy Peterburg, "The police are unlikely to put much effort into the investigation, since Andruschenko wrote a lot about the arbitrariness in the police, and he was not liked for his intransigence." The attackers are still unknown.

Context 
Andruschnko is the seventh journalist to die in Putin's second presidency. The day after Andruschenko was assaulted another journalist was attacked. 35-year old Yevgeny Khamaganov died on March 17 because of his injuries. All the killed journalist wrote about and investigated cases of corruption on a local or national level.

Impact 
Nikolay Andruschenko invested several cases of corruption after the end of the Soviet Union. He was known as a Vladimir Putin critic and for his articles about human rights and police misuse of authority.

See also
 Human rights in Russia
 List of journalists killed in Russia 
 Media freedom in Russia

References

External links 
 "Who is Mr. Putin?" (Russian)
 "Who is Mr. Putin?" (English Subtitles)

1943 births
2017 deaths
Deaths by beating in Europe
Journalists killed in Russia
Murdered Russian journalists
People murdered in Russia